The Hackett River is a tributary of the Sheslay River in northwest part of the province of British Columbia, Canada.

The Hackett River's watershed's land cover is classified as 35.2% conifer forest, 30.5% shrubland, 11.8% mixed forest, 11.6% barren, 5.4% herbaceous, and small amounts of other cover.

The Hackett River is in the traditional territory of the Tahltan people.

Geography
The Hackett River originates with several small streams flowing into Kennicott Lake, on the south side of Level Mountain on the Nahlin Plateau. It first flows to Hatchau Lake, then through the Salmon Creek 3 Indian reserve, of the Tahltan First Nation, part of the Tahltan people.

Continuing northwest between Level Mountain and Kaketsa Mountain, the Hackett River flows through a wetland then through a gorge. Along the way it is joined by Stone Creek, Copper Creek, Pyrrhotite Creek, and Egnell Creek, before joining the Sheslay River. The Egnell telegraph station was located at the mouth of Egnell Creek, not far from the mouth of the Hackett River. The locality of Sheslay is located at its confluence with the river of that name.

History
The historic Yukon Telegraph Trail follows the Hackett River, running northwest from Saloon on the upper Little Tahltan River to Hyland Ranch on the upper Hackett, and on to Egnell and Sheslay near the mouth of the Hackett River.

See also
List of British Columbia rivers

References

External links
 

Cassiar Country
Level Mountain
Rivers of British Columbia
Stikine Country
Nahlin Plateau
Tahltan